Kuraman Island, alternative name Keraman Island, is an outlying island in the Federal Territory of Labuan, Malaysia located on the northern mouth of Brunei Bay. It is sparsely populated and is popular with expatriates, divers and those who travel between Labuan and Brunei. Its land area measures 147 hectares. Together with the much smaller islands Pulau Rusukan Besar and Pulau Rusukan Kecil it forms the Labuan Marine Park.

A historical name for Kuraman is Mompracem, a name that was used by the writer Emilio Salgari for the island of his fictional character Sandokan.

Kuraman island has two main beaches and is noted for its fishing, large sand spit and pleasant tropical island atmosphere. The interior is forested with a range of timbers and contains cleared paths for jungle walks. In recent years, large storms have contributed to increased erosion resulting in several areas of vegetation and numerous buildings being washed into the sea.

In the surrounding waters off Kuraman there are several known shipwrecks including the Dutch Steamer SS De Klerk and a minesweeper, the USS Salute, both sunk during the Second World War. Kuraman, like the rest of North Borneo, was captured by the Japanese during this period and was liberated by the Australian Army in 1945, although no fighting ever occurred on the island. Two other major shipwrecks can be found in the area: the MV Tung Hwuang, a freighter that sank in the 1980s while transporting cement to Brunei for the Sultan's new palace, and the MV Mabini Padre, a trawler from the Philippines which caught fire and sank in 1981.

Kuraman has no roads or vehicles and it can only be reached by boat. There is a small private jetty and a new larger government pier which assist in providing access. A lighthouse, built by the British in 1897, is situated on the highest point of the island. Kuraman is populated by predominantly illegal immigrants from the Philippines, who claim to be a local Malay community, with a small village that includes a bar which serves food and is locally known for its fried chicken. Basic accommodation is also available, with small shacks available for rent.

In 2004 a group of expatriates from Brunei contemplated building a bar/clubhouse for divers, however nothing resulted from this due to various legal complications. Apparently in a tongue-in-cheek manner, this same group then announced plans to develop the island and declare independence or greater self-government, stating a perceived dubious Malaysian claim to the island resulting from a conflicting historic Bruneian claim to Kuraman and its surrounding islands. This went as far as designing a flag for the island, similar to the many unofficial flags which have originated in varying areas around the globe. This was taken lightheartedly in both Labuan and Brunei and could be looked upon as a form of micronationalism.

See also
 List of islands of Malaysia

References 

Labuan